Meenakshi Ponnunga ( Meenakshi's daughters) is a 2022 Indian Tamil-language television drama airing on Zee Tamil and streams on digital platform ZEE5. The series premiered on 1 August 2022, it stars Archana with Soundarya Reddy and Aryan in the lead roles. It is an official remake of Zee Telugu series Radhamma Kuthuru.

Synopsis
Meenakshi gives birth of three daughters Yamuna, Shakthi and Durga. Meenakshi's husband, desperately wanted a son decided to marry Pushpa. So Meenakshi runs a mess named "Meenakshi Mess" with the help of her daughters which was a famous mess in that village. Shakthi vows to become an IAS officer to avenge her father. Meanwhile Vetri, son of Ranganayagi falls in love with Shakthi.

Cast

Main
 Mokshitha Pai  / Soundarya Reddy  as Shakthi – Meenakshi and Needhimani's second daughter; Yamuna's younger sister; Durga's elder sister; Vetri's love interest and wife; Ranganayagi's daughter-in-law
 Archana as Meenakshi – Needhimani's first wife; Yamuna, Shakthi and Durga's mother; Karthik and Vetri's mother-in-law
 Aryan as Vetri – Ranganayaki's son; Saranya's brother; Pooja's ex-fiancé; Shakthi's husband

Recurring
 Gayathri Yuvraj as Yamuna – Meenakshi and Needhimani's first daughter; Shakthi and Durga's elder sister; Karthik's love interest and wife
 Pranika Dhakshu as Durga – Meenakshi and Needhimani's last daughter; Shakthi and Yamuna's younger sister
 Sasilaya as Ranganayagi – Vetri and Sunganya's mother; Shakthi and Ashok's mother-in-law
 Anandmouli as Ranganayagi's husband 
 Subathira as Pushpa − Needhimani's second wife; Shanmugam's mother
 Prabhakaran as Needhimani – Meenakshi and Pushpa's husband; Yamuna, Shakthi, Durga and Shanmugam's father; Karthik and Vetri's father-in-law 
 Suganya as Saranya – Ranganayagi's daughter; Vetri's sister; Ashok's wife
 Hema Dayal as Pooja – Vetri's ex-fianceè 
 Sudharsanam / Vishnukanth as Karthik – Kokila's son; Yamuna's husband 
 Aarthi Ramkumar as Kokila – Karthik's mother
 Singaraja as Kokila's husband and Karthik's mother
 Deepa Shankar as Shantha – Meenakshi's friend and maid
 Vigneshwaran as Ashok – Saranya's husband
 Thidiyan as Thidiyan – Vetri's friend
 Tom Frank as Vetri's friend
 Sanjay as Shanmugam – Needhimani and Pushpa's son

Soundtrack
All the title tracks of the series was composed by Radhan. The song Kannala Thaakura was sung by Sarath Santhosh and lyrics by Ku. Karthik.

Production

Development
After the ending of the longest running Zee Tamil TV drama Sembaruthi, its Production Company Insidues Media decide to produce Meenakshi Ponnunga. The series was directed by Neethane Enthan Ponvasantham fame L. Muthukumaraswamy.

Actress Archana was signed to portray the titular role Meenakshi in her first television debut. Mokshitha Pai, was selected to play the role Shakthi, by marking her debut in Tamil Television Network but later was replaced by Soundarya Reddy in November 2022 who also made her debut in Tamil Television Network. Aryan was selected to play the character Vetri. Tamil Motivational speaker Sasilaya, made her first acting in the role of Renganayagi.

Promotion
Zee Tamil was promoted their new three fictions Maari, Amudhavum Annalakshmiyum and including this series by making advertisement with actress Sneha, Saranya Ponvannan and Sangeetha with the slogan "Vanga Paarkalaam Ithu Namma Time" and this promo released on 26 June 2022.

Adaptations

References

External links
 
 Meenakshi Ponnunga at ZEE5

Zee Tamil original programming
Tamil-language television soap operas
Television shows set in Tamil Nadu
Tamil-language romance television series
Tamil-language melodrama television series
2022 Tamil-language television series debuts
Tamil-language television series based on Telugu-language television series